KKRE 92.5 FM is a radio station licensed to Hollis, Oklahoma. The station is silent since July 25, 2020 and is owned by Monte Spearman and Gentry Todd Spearman, through licensee High Plains Radio Network, LLC.

The owner of the station said "Yes at this time unfortunately it is. Hope to get finances and this situation all better in future and get our oldies back on."

References

External links

KRE
Radio stations established in 2005
2005 establishments in Oklahoma